Namune is an Indian television series that was aired on Saturday and Sunday on SAB TV. The series based on the P.L. Deshpande's Characters.

Plot

The show is about the life of Kunal Kumar as Niranjan Agnihotri, a policy insurance services man. He is always serious and troubled in his life. All the characters of the show try to make him happy.

Cast

Main

Kunal Kumar as Niranjan Agnihotri
Toral Rasputra as Bhairavi Agnihotri 
Farida Dadi as Kaushalya Agnihotri
Saloni Daini as Kavya Agnihotri
Aryan Prajapati as Lalit Agnihotri

Recurring

Sanjay Mone as P.L. Deshpande
Krunal Pandit as Satish Kataria, Neeranjan's boss
Mushtaq Khan as Neeranjan's new boss
Jaineeraj Rajpurohit as Mr. Lele, Neeranjan's neighbour and his residential society's secretary
Sharmila Rajaram Shinde as Mrs.Lele

Cameo appearances

Paresh Ganatra as Gampu aka Paropkaari Chandu 
Sushant Singh as Babdu aka Joginder
Deven Bhojani as Narayan aka Murari
Nagesh Bhonsle as Namu Parit as Damu Istriwala
Manoj Joshi as Mohan Ji aka Hari Tatya
Aastad Kale as Shashi Sarang
Subodh Bhave as Prem
 Sachin Shroff as Sharad (Episode 21 & Episode 22)

References

Sony SAB original programming
Indian comedy television series
2018 Indian television series debuts
2018 Indian television series endings